Shelby may refer to:

Places

United States
 Shelby, Alabama, a census-designated place and unincorporated community
 Shelby, Idaho
 Shelby, Indiana, an unincorporated town
 Shelby, Iowa, a city
 Shelby, Oceana County, Michigan, a village
 Shelby, Mississippi, a city
 Shelby, Missouri, an unincorporated community
 Shelby, Montana, a city
 Shelby, Nebraska, a village
 Shelby, New York, a town
 Shelby, North Carolina, a small city
 Shelby, Ohio, a city
 Shelby, Texas, an unincorporated town
 Shelby, Virginia
 Shelby, Wisconsin, a town
 Shelby (community), Wisconsin, an unincorporated community
 Camp Shelby, a military post adjacent to Hattiesburg, Mississippi
 Fort Shelby (Michigan), a military fort in Detroit, in use from 1779 to 1826
 Fort Shelby (Wisconsin), an American military installation built in 1814 and destroyed by the British in 1815
 Shelby County (disambiguation)
 Shelby Township (disambiguation)

Elsewhere
 Mount Shelby, a mountain in Antarctica

Arts, entertainment, and media
 Shelby (album), a 2019  album by Lil Skies
 Shelby (film), a 2014 film starring Chevy Chase
 Shelby (toy), a Furby Friend toy released in 2001
 "Shelby '68", a song by Kylie Minogue from Golden

People 
 Shelby (name), with a list of people and fictional entities named Shelby
 Uncle Shelby, the pen name used by Shel Silverstein (1930–1999) when writing children's books

Transportation
 AC Cobra (Shelby Cobra)
 Shelby American, an American automobile manufacturer
 Ford Shelby Cobra Concept
 Shelby Cycle Company, a bicycle manufacturer in Shelby, Ohio
 Shelby Mustang, a higher performance variant of the Ford Mustang
 Shelby SuperCars, former name of SSC North America, an American automobile manufacturer
 , a World War II attack transport

Other uses 
 Shelby County v. Holder, a U.S. Supreme Court case sometimes referred to as Shelby

See also 
 Selby
 Shelbyville (disambiguation)